Bănică Oprea (born 2 November 1967) is a Romanian former footballer who played as a forward. After he ended his playing career he worked as a manager at clubs from the Romanian lower leagues.

Honours
Callatis Mangalia
Divizia C: 1987–88, 1998–99

Notes

References

1967 births
Living people
Romanian footballers
Association football forwards
Liga I players
Liga II players
FCV Farul Constanța players
FC Callatis Mangalia players
Romanian football managers
People from Medgidia